This is a list of video games with mechanics based on collectible card games. It includes games which directly simulate collectible card games (often called digital collectible card games), arcade games integrated with physical collectible card games, and video games in other genres which utilize elements of deck-building or card battling as a significant portion of their game mechanics. It does not include games which only feature card collecting or card battling as a minigame, nor does it include games which simulate traditional card games such as solitaire or poker.

Legend

List of games

See also 
 List of collectible card games
 Lists of video games

Notes

References 

 
Digital_collectible_card_games